Smash may refer to:

People
 Smash (wrestler) (born 1959), professional wrestler
 Moondog Rex, another professional wrestler who briefly wrestled as the original Smash, before being replaced by the above.
 DJ Smash, DJ and music producer

Art, entertainment, and media
 Smash (novel), a 1980 novel by Garson Kanin
 Smash! (comics), a 1960s British comic
 smash., a Japanese video streaming service
 Super Smash Bros., a platform fighting video game series with characters from Nintendo and third-party franchises

Fictional entities
 SMASH (comics), a team of superheroes
 Smash Williams, fictional character in the television series Friday Night Lights

Film and television
 Smash (Swedish TV series), a 1990 Swedish miniseries
 Smash (TV series), a 2012 NBC drama series
 Attack on Tomorrow, a 1977 Japanese anime series known in Europe as Smash
 Smash Pictures, an adult film production company 
 Smash, a 1971 SRC variety series starring Patsy Gallant and others

Music

Bands and enterprises
 Smash (music promoters), a Japanese rock music concert and festival promoter
 Smash Records, a record label 
 Smash (British band), an English punk trio
 Smash (Indonesian band), a boy band from Indonesia
 Smash (Russian band), a Russian pop duo
 Smash (Spanish band), 1967–1973

Albums
 Smash (Jackson and His Computerband album)
 Smash (Martin Solveig album), 2011
 Smash (Switch album)
 Smash (The Offspring album)
 SMASH, an album by Cindy Alexander

Songs
 "Smash", song by the Norwegian singer Tone Damli
 "Smash", song by American band The Offspring from Smash
 "Smash", song by American rapper Rob Stone from Don't Wait For It
 "Smash", song by American band The Casualties
 "Smash", song by South Korean singer BoA from Kiss My Lips
 "Smash", song by American band Goo Goo Dolls from Gutterflower
 "Smash", song by American band Varsity
 "Smash!", song by the Dutch-Turkish Ummet Ozcan
 "Smash!", song from the TV series Smash
 "Smash!", song by American rapper XXXTentacion from ?
 "Smash!", song by American comedy group Starbomb from Player Select

Computing
 SMASH (hash), a cryptographic hash function
 Systems Management Architecture for Server Hardware
 WebSphere sMash, a software environment

Events
 Smash! (comics), a 1960s British comic
 SMASH! (convention), an annual Japanese popular culture convention held in Sydney, Australia

Food and drink
 Smash (instant mashed potato), a brand of instant mashed potatoes
 Smash (chocolate), a Norwegian chocolate snack
 Smash (cocktail), a casual cocktail filled with hunks of fresh fruit

Mathematics
 Smash product, in algebraic topology

Sport
 Smash (professional wrestling), a Japanese promotion
 An overhead shot in some racket sports such as:
 Smash (tennis)
 Smash (pickleball)

Education
 Santa Monica Alternative School House (SMASH), an alternative school in Santa Monica, California, United States

Other uses
 Aselsan SMASH, a remote controlled weapon station